Elvira Shatayeva was a Russian professional mountain climber and professional athlete and the leader of a failed expedition to Pik Lenina, Pamir, Tajikistan-Kyrgyzstan border in August 1974. At the time of her death in 1974, she was one of the most famous climbers in the USSR.

In 1972, she led an all-women's ascent of Peak Korzhenevskaya in Tajikistan. In 1973, she led an expedition of the Ushba in Georgia.

In August 1974, she attempted to conquer hiking to peak Lenin with an all-female group for the first time in history. The group included: Nina Vasilyeva and Valentina Fateyeva of Moscow; Ilsinar Mukhamedova and Tatyana Sardashova of Dushanbe; Galina Perekhodyuk of Chelyabinsk; Lyudmila Manzharova of Frunze and Irina Lyubimtseva of Sverdlovsk. Her entire group died on the mountain, as reported by American Pamirs/USSR Expedition that was on the mountain at the same time.

Shatayeva's husband, Vladimir Shatayev, wrote a memoir about the experience and his life called Degrees of Difficulty.

References 

Female climbers
Russian mountain climbers
Living people
Year of birth missing (living people)